Edward (Ted) Millstein is an attorney in Philadelphia. He is best known for representing plaintiffs in lawsuits against large corporations such as Visa, MasterCard, and Volkswagen. Millstein is also well known for his representation of victims of the Holocaust. He was instrumental in obtaining reparations for victims and their families, which resulted in the formation of a foundation with over $5 billion in assets.

Legal and Finance Career

Visa and MasterCard 
Millstein was of primary counsel in Currency Conversion Fee Antitrust Litigation, MDL 1409, where a settlement was negotiated to provide a $336 million fund and injunctive relief for a class of U.S. cardholders of Visa and MasterCard-branded credit and debit/ATM cards who had used their cards to make foreign denominated transactions.

Digital Music Antitrust 
While at Berger and Montague, Millstein was appointed as chair of the executive committee in Digital Music Antitrust Litigation, MDL 1780, a case involving collusion between and among the five major record labels to fix the price of digital music.

Slave Labor and The Aryanization 
Millstein served as counsel in cases filed against fourteen German industrial companies and banks arising out of the use of slave labor and the Aryanization of Jewish assets during the Holocaust. He was among a small group of American lawyers who participated in international negotiations sponsored by the Governments of the U.S. and Germany that resulted in the creation of a German Foundation with assets of $5 billion, established for the benefit of the victims of slave labor Aryanization, as well as other wrongs of the Nazi era. Mr. Millstein was a signatory of the Joint Statement affirming the establishment of the German Foundation.

References

Footnotes

Year of birth missing (living people)
Place of birth missing (living people)
Living people